A Pair of Kings is a studio recording released by the Western band Riders in the Sky on February 19, 2002. It is available as a single CD.

The "pair of kings" referenced in the album's title are featured Riders Joey "the Cowpolka King" Miskulin and Woody Paul, King of the Cowboy Fiddlers. Allmusic stated in their review: "These four diehards are one of the few acts still making records in the traditional cowboy style, and their releases each deserve all of the recognition they get."

Track listing
 "We're Burnin' Moonlight" (Joey Miskulin) – 2:15
 "Clarinet Polka" – 2:17
 "You Stole My Wife You Horsethief" (Reif, Sims) – 2:43
 "How High the Moon" (Hamilton, Lewis) – 3:34
 "Texas Sand" – 2:21
 "Celtic Medley – Annie Laurie/Scotland the Brave/Haste to the Wedding" – 3:29
 "I'm an Old Cowhand (From the Rio Grande)" (Mercer) – 2:38
 "Jessie Polka" – 2:32
 "Never Go to Church on Sunday" (Paul) – 2:22
 "The Bunkhouse Race" (Dizzy Fingers) – 2:08
 "Don't Sweetheart Me" (Friend, Tobias)– 2:27
 "Katherine's Waltz" (Paul) – 2:51

Personnel
Douglas B. Green (a.k.a. Ranger Doug) – vocals, guitar
Paul Chrisman (a.k.a. Woody Paul) – vocals, fiddle
Fred LaBour (a.k.a. Too Slim) – vocals, bass
Joey Miskulin (a.k.a. Joey The Cowpolka King) – vocals, accordion

External links
Riders in the Sky Official Website

Notes 

2002 albums
Riders in the Sky (band) albums
Oh Boy Records albums